Hafslundsøy is a small island located in the middle of the river Glomma just outside Sarpsborg in  Østfold, Norway. It had 2,673 inhabitants in 2016.

River islands of Norway
Populated places on the Glomma River
Islands of Viken (county)